The No Regrets Conference is a yearly, Wisconsin-based Christian men's conference hosted at Elmbrook Church starting in 1994. As of 2017, the conference is live-streamed to  satellite sites throughout the world.

As stated on the conference website: "No Regrets Men's Ministries is a worldwide men’s ministry committed to equipping local church leaders to disciple men who disciple men – empowering the next generation to multiply themselves by becoming servant leaders at home, in church, on the job and out in the world."

History
The yearly conference is generally held on the first Saturday of February. Upwards of 5,000 men come from around the state to pray, hear keynote sessions, attend seminars, meet with other men or get information about volunteer opportunities (both locally and globally). There is a special teen track of seminars. There is also a men's ministry track of seminars that develops church staff into better leaders.

The main conference location is Elmbrook Church in Brookfield, Wisconsin. In 2009, the conference was concurrently held at Westbrook Church in Delafield, Wisconsin and New Testament church in Milwaukee, Wisconsin. The conference is almost entirely run by over 200 volunteers.

Seminars
Seminar topics range throughout a variety of topics including:
Engaging With Your Community
Finances - A Heavenly Perspective
Living in Your Step-Family and Leading with Love (Blended Families)
Meeting Jesus For the First Time
Prayer: After God's Own Heart
Understanding the Technology in Your Kid's Life

Keynote speakers

References

External links
No Regrets Conference Official Website
Elmbrook Church Website
News article about the 2007 Conference
News article before the 2006 Conference

Christianity in Wisconsin
Evangelical Christian conferences